429 Records was an American record label. It was a subsidiary label of Savoy Label Group/Nippon Columbia focusing on indie rock and adult album alternative performers. In addition to releasing new material from musicians such as Dr. John, Little Feat, Cracker, and Gin Blossoms, the label released several compilation albums, including Endless Highway: The Music of The Band and A Song for My Father, a set of recordings of songs by sons and daughters of the original artists.

Savoy was bought by the Concord Music Group in 2017.

Roster
 Joan Armatrading
 Eef Barzelay
 Blues Traveler
 The Bodeans
 Camper Van Beethoven
 Paul Carrack
 Toni Childs
 Circa Zero
 The Constellations
 Cracker
 Marshall Crenshaw
 Dr. John
 Echo & the Bunnymen
 Everclear
 The Features
 Roberta Flack
 Mick Fleetwood
 Steve Forbert
 Gin Blossoms
 Macy Gray
 Jackie Greene
 Bruce Hornsby & The Noisemakers
 Sonya Kitchell
 Little Feat
 LL Cool J
 Los Lobos
 Lisa Loeb
 David Lowery
 Edwin McCain
 Meat Loaf
 New York Dolls
 Steve Nieve
 John Popper
 The Proclaimers
 The Rides
 Tim Robbins
 Robbie Robertson
 The Roches
 Paul Rodgers
 Boz Scaggs
 Skybombers
 Smash Mouth
 Clem Snide
 Soul Asylum
 Ronnie Spector
 The Subdudes
 Tonic
 The Warren Brothers

References

American record labels